Kolola Springs is an unincorporated community in Lowndes County, Mississippi.

Kolola Springs is located at  near U.S. Route 45, north of Columbus and west of Caledonia. According to the United States Geological Survey, a variant name is Shinns Spring.

Kolola Springs may be derived from a Chickasaw name meaning "singing springs".

References

Unincorporated communities in Lowndes County, Mississippi
Unincorporated communities in Mississippi
Mississippi placenames of Native American origin